Kőrös may refer to:

 Kőrös, the Hungarian name of Križevci, Croatia  
 Endre Kőrös (1927–2002), Hungarian chemist

See also
 The historic Belovár-Kőrös County or Bjelovar-Križevci County, named for Križevci
 Körös (disambiguation)